In chemistry, a contact number (CN) is a simple solvent exposure measure that measures residue burial in proteins. The definition of CN varies between authors, but is generally defined as the number of either C or C atoms within a sphere around the C or C atom of the residue.  The radius of the sphere is typically chosen to be between 8 and 14Å.

See also
 Kissing number, a similar concept in mathematics

References

Solvents